Julie Elizabeth May (born 19 March 1964) is an English cricketer and former member of the England women's cricket team who played as a right-handed batter and right-arm off break bowler. She played three Test matches against India in 1986. She played domestic cricket for Kent.

References

External links
 
 

Living people
England women Test cricketers
1964 births
Sportspeople from Dartford
Kent women cricketers